The Toowoomba Connection Road is a  former section of the Warrego Highway that passes through the city of Toowoomba in Queensland, Australia. With the opening of the Toowoomba Bypass in 2019 the Warrego Highway was redirected to it, and the bypassed section of the highway was renamed Toowoomba Connection Road and assigned the route number A21.

Route description
The road commences in the rural locality of Helidon Spa, where it diverges from the Warrego Highway, providing a more direct route to the Toowoomba CBD. It passes through the rural localities of Postmans Ridge and Withcott before ascending the Great Dividing Range to Toowoomba. It passes between the CBD and South Toowoomba before turning north and then north-west through the suburbs of Newtown and Wilsonton. It then passes through outer suburbs to the rural locality of Charlton, where it ends at an intersection with the Warrego Highway and the Gore Highway.

History 
In January 2011, the Warrego Highway was extensively damaged where it crossed the Toowoomba Range.  This included land slips, shoulder and embankment erosion, the erosion of drains and damaged rock fall netting.  The road wasn't fully repaired with all four lanes open until September 2011.

The Toowoomba Bypass was completed in September 2019 and bypasses the urban area of Toowoomba and provides a better crossing of the Great Dividing Range. Warrego Highway (A2) was rerouted via the bypass between Helidon Spa (in the east) and the interchange at Charlton (in the west). The original section of Warrego Highway through Toowoomba was renamed Toowoomba Connection Road (A21).

The "Toll Bar"
The section of the Warrego Highway from Withcott to the top of the Toowoomba Range was first opened in January, 1855 as a toll road, named Toll Bar Road. The toll collection point was marked by a bar across the road and a fence on either side. The upper section of Toll Bar Road was initially unsealed and very steep, with grades up to 14%. This road remained in use until December, 1939, when work on a new, less steep, upper section was completed. Part of the upper section is now a suburban street named Old Toll Bar Road. The term "The Toll Bar" is sometimes used by locals to describe the current road, and it is also used in the mapping software distributed with Navman GPS systems.

Upgrades

James Street culverts
A project under the Warrego Highway funding arrangements to upgrade two culverts in James Street (now part of this road) at a cost of $21.1 million, was completed in December 2020.

Hursley Road intersection
A project to develop a business case for the upgrade of the Hursley Road intersection, at a cost of $500,000, was to start in November 2021.

Major intersections

See also
List of road routes in Queensland

References

Roads in Queensland
Toowoomba